"When You Die" is a song by American pop and rock band MGMT, and the second single from the band's fourth studio album Little Dark Age. It was released worldwide on December 12, 2017, through Columbia Records.

Recording
The song was recorded in 2017. It was co-written by Ariel Pink, who also plays guitar on the song.

Artwork

The song's artwork is based on an illustration in The Heart of Man; Either a Temple of God, or a Habitation of Satan; Represented in Ten Emblematical Figures, an 1851 book by German religious figure Johannes Evangelista Gossner.

Music video
The music video was directed by Mike Burakoff and Hallie Cooper-Novack, and was released on December 12, 2017 through The New Yorker along with the audio release. The video stars Alex Karpovsky and Lucy Kaminsky, with Karpovsky playing a failing magician that appears to die and watch his death through a psychedelic trip presumably in purgatory.  

The video has been viewed 29 million times through the band's official Vevo account on YouTube.

Track listing

Charts

References

2018 songs
2018 singles
MGMT songs
Song recordings produced by Patrick Wimberly
Songs written by Andrew VanWyngarden
Songs written by Benjamin Goldwasser